"Cheap Sunglasses" is a 1979 single by ZZ Top from their 1979 album Degüello.  The song captures many of the sounds and beats for which ZZ Top is famous. It is also featured on the greatest hits collections ZZ Top's Greatest Hits, Chrome, Smoke & BBQ, and Rancho Texicano. In addition, a live version of the song appears on Chrome, Smoke & BBQ and Rancho Texicano.

In a Guitar World article, lead guitarist Billy Gibbons said that he used a Marshall Major amplifier and a Maestro ring modulator on this song, and that the amplifier had a blown tube during recording which added to the tonal character of the song. The Marshall Major is a slightly taller, 200-watt version of the classic Marshall 100-watt head.

Cash Box called it "smoldering, blues-rock" with humorous lyrics.  Record World said that it "offers wry wit and earthy rock riffs." The opening somewhat resembles the opening of "Hot Stuff", a 1976 song by The Rolling Stones.

Charts

Cover versions and samples

The rap duo EPMD sampled "Cheap Sunglasses" on their song "You're a Customer" (which appears on their 1988 debut album Strictly Business).

Kid Rock samples it on his song "Cramp Ya Style" for his 1990 debut Grits Sandwiches for Breakfast.

Midwest rap artist Esham sampled the song in his production for the song "Nine Dead Bodies" of his 1992 double album Judgement Day.

The Warren Brothers covered the song on the 2002 compilation album Sharp Dressed Men: A Tribute to ZZ Top.

Wolfmother covered the song on the 2011 tribute album, ZZ Top: A Tribute from Friends.

The Sword covered the song on the deluxe version of their 2012 album Apocryphon.

Apathy covered the song on his 2007 mixtape album Baptism by Fire.

Personnel
Billy Gibbons – vocals, lead and rhythm guitars
Dusty Hill – bass, keyboards
Frank Beard – drums

References

1980 singles
ZZ Top songs
Songs written by Frank Beard (musician)
Songs written by Dusty Hill
Songs written by Billy Gibbons
1979 songs
Warner Records singles
Song recordings produced by Bill Ham